Trisetum ciliare is a species of grass in the family Poaceae.

References

ciliare